Peter Egharevba is a Nigerian retired footballer that played for New Nigeria Bank F.C. in the 1980s. He also played for Nigeria Youth team in that period. He Also played for Benin Based Club Bendel Insurance F.C. and scored against rangers in a great win in 1978 to win the Nigerian FA cup in Lagos. Peter was part of the great Bendel Insurance F.C. in the 80's According to the Nigerian Guardian Newspaper

References

Year of birth missing (living people)
Living people
Nigerian footballers

Association footballers not categorized by position
New Nigerian Bank F.C. players